Lena Saradnik (born January 23, 1947) is a former member of the Arizona House of Representatives. She represented the 26th District for a single term during the 48th Legislature, winning the November 2006 election, filling the seat vacated by Steve Huffman, who chose not to seek re-election. She chose not to run for re-election in 2008.

References

Democratic Party members of the Arizona House of Representatives
1947 births
Living people